Nellie Irene Snyder Yost (June 20, 1905 – January 16, 1992) was a historian and writer. She was an active member of the Nebraska State Historical Society, serving for many years as its president, and wrote 13 books (primarily biographies) and many articles on Nebraska history, including biographies of her father, her mother, and Buffalo Bill Cody.

Early life
Nellie Irene Snyder was born on June 20, 1905, to Albert Benton Snyder and Grace Bell McCance Snyder, in a sod house in northwest Lincoln County, Nebraska. At the age of two weeks, she was carried on horseback to a ranch in McPherson County, Nebraska. She suffered a childhood illness that permanently damaged her spine and slowed her growth resulting in her diminutive height of 4 feet,8 inches. She lived with her family in McPherson County until 1919 when the family moved to Maxwell, Nebraska, where she graduated as class valedictorian in 1923. She taught one year in a rural McPherson County school, riding horseback to her school  a day. After that, she moved to Salem, Oregon, for two years, where she worked in the office of Miller Department Store.

Family and later life
After moving back to Nebraska, she married David Harrison "Harry" Yost on July 6, 1929, and the couple lived on a ranch in the Box Elder Canyon, south of North Platte, Nebraska, for 30 years. They had one son, Thomas Snyder Yost. Harry fell ill and spent his last five years at the Grand Island Veterans Hospital. During those years, as Nellie spent about 10 days out of each month at the hospital, she would sit by his bed side, writing manuscripts in long hand. He died in 1968. She moved to North Platte, Nebraska, where she was active in the Lincoln County Historical Society. She was very active while in the Historical Society as they worked to open the Lincoln County Museum in 1976. She was active as well in Nebraska Writers Guild. She was active in Riverside Baptist Church where she married Frank A. Lydic on August 30, 1984. He was a long time friend and fellow writer. Frank died on November 9, 1991. Soon after, while finishing a trip to promote her last book, she developed pneumonia and was hospitalized. She was transferred to a hospital in Lincoln where she died on January 16, 1992. She was buried next to her first husband at Fort McPherson National Cemetery. Her information was carved on the back of his gravestone with the epitaph, "She Loved Life."

Writing
Her first book, Pinnacle Jake, was a recounting of her father's stories about the west and ranching. Nellie was 46 when it was published. No Time on My Hands was based on a diary her mother had kept. One of her most noted books, Buffalo Bill: His Family, Friends, Fame, Failures and Fortunes, was published in 1979. It received excellent reviews, garnered awards, and resulted in a trip to New York to appear on Good Morning America on February 22, 1980. Her last book, Evil Obsession, was published in October 1991, just a few months before she died. During her 40 years as a published author, she traveled extensively.

Awards and honors
Eyes of Nebraska Award, Nebraska Optometric Association, 1970
Tenth annual Spur Award for Boss Cowman, 1969
Western Heritage Wrangler Award, Cowboy Hall of Fame, for Buffalo Bill, 1979
Golden Saddleman, 1975
Nebraska Foundation Pioneer Award, 1982

Bibliography
Pinnacle Jake, Caxton Printers, Ltd., Caldwell, Idaho, 1951
The West That Was, Southern Methodist University Press, Dallas, Texas, 1958
No Time on My Hands, Caxton Printers, Ltd., Caldwell, Idaho, 1963
The Call of the Range, Ohio University Press, Athens, Ohio, 1966
Medicine Lodge, Ohio University Press, Athens, Ohio, 1966
Boss Cowman, Nebraska University Press, Lincoln, Nebraska, 1969
Before Today, Holt County Historical Society, O'Neill, Nebraska, 1976
Buffalo Bill: His Family, Friends, Fame, Failures and Fortunes, Ohio University Press, Athens, Ohio, 1979
A Man as Big as the West, Pruett Publishing Co., Boulder, Colorado, 1979 – biography of Ralph Hubbard
Back Trail of an Old Cowboy, University of Nebraska Press, Lincoln, Nebraska, 1983
Keep On Keeping On, Self Published, 1983
Pinnacle Jake & Pinnacle Jake Roundup, J. L. Lee Publishers, Lincoln, Nebraska, 1991
Evil Obsession: The Annie Cook Story, Westport Publishers, Lincoln, Nebraska, 1991

References
Obituary, North Platte Telegraph, January 17, 1992

External links
Official Website - maintained by family

 

1905 births
1992 deaths
People from Lincoln County, Nebraska
People from McPherson County, Nebraska
Writers from Nebraska
American women historians
20th-century American women writers
20th-century American historians
Cowgirl Hall of Fame inductees